Cafe Mor is a studio album by Scorn, released in 2019 by Ohm Resistance. It was the first Scorn album in nine years, preceded by Refuse; Start Fires. The track "Talk Whiff" features Jason Williamson of Sleaford Mods on vocals.

Critical response 
The album received a positive response from critics. The Quietus described it as "sonically contemptuous, imperious, snide". For Igloo Magazine the album "shows a master at work — honing and developing his signature sound".

Track listing

References

External links 
 

2019 albums
Scorn (band) albums
Albums produced by Mick Harris